The 1968–69 Iraq Central FA Premier League was the 21st season of the Iraq Central FA League (the top division of football in Baghdad and its neighbouring cities from 1948 to 1973). Eleven teams competed in the tournament, which was at first played in a round-robin format.

After three rounds of the league had taken place, the Iraq Central Football Association (IFA) decided to annul the results of the matches that had been played due to a lack of sufficient funds to complete the rest of the matches. The tournament was restarted under a double-elimination format where teams were eliminated after two defeats, and matches that ended in a draw would be decided by a drawing of lots.

Aliyat Al-Shorta beat Al-Quwa Al-Jawiya in the final to win their second consecutive league title. Al-Quwa Al-Jawiya player Hisham Atta was the league's top scorer with four goals.

Original season
The season began in a round-robin format, and three rounds of the original competition were played. Al-Quwa Al-Jawiya led the table with six points after winning all three of their games, with Hisham Atta scoring a hat-trick in their first game. Aliyat Al-Shorta earned three points after one win (4–0 against Al-Omma), one draw and one loss.

Below are the results from the first round of matches:

Restarted season
Due to a lack of sufficient funds to complete the rest of the matches, the IFA annulled the results of the original season and restarted the competition as a double-elimination tournament. Al-Quwa Al-Jawiya moved to the losers bracket after losing to Maslahat Naqil Al-Rukab on a drawing of lots after the game at Al-Kashafa Stadium had ended in a draw.

On the same day and at the same ground, Aliyat Al-Shorta drew 0–0 with Al-Bareed wal-Barq, but the IFA ordered the game to be replayed due to a goal by Al-Bareed wal-Barq player Kadhim Abboud being controversially ruled out. Al-Bareed wal-Barq decided to withdraw from the competition as a result of the incident and Aliyat Al-Shorta advanced.

Al-Quwa Al-Jawiya later beat Maslahat Naqil Al-Rukab to reach the final where Aliyat Al-Shorta won 3–1 to claim the title.

Top three positions

Matches

Final

References

External links
 Iraqi Football Website

Iraq Central FA League seasons
Iraq
1968 in Iraqi sport
1969 in Iraqi sport